Power 98 may refer to:

Power 98 (radio station), an English radio station in Singapore
Power 98 (film), a 1996 film starring Eric Roberts about a Los Angeles talk radio station
"Power 98", official nickname of radio station WPEG, in Charlotte, North Carolina, United States